Lessertina is a genus of African araneomorph spiders in the family Cheiracanthiidae, first described by R. F. Lawrence in 1942.  it contains only two species, both found in South Africa.

References

Endemic fauna of South Africa
Araneomorphae genera
Cheiracanthiidae
Spiders of South Africa